Giorgio Domenico Duprà (1689-1770) was an Italian rococo court painter born at Turin who was active in the 18th century.

Educated in Rome, Domenico Duprà was a disciple of Francesco Trevisani. He was also strongly influenced by the French school of portrait. From 1719 he began working at the Lisbon court of King John V, the Magnanimous of Portugal, where he remained notably as court painter until 1730.

Back in Rome he was employed by the exiled Jacobite court of the Stuarts at the Palazzo Muti.

In 1750 he returned to Turin and with his brother Giuseppe Duprà (1703-1784) worked for the royal House of Savoy. He died at Turin in 1770. The Prado Museum preserves three of his works depicting females members of royalty quickly recognizable for its delicate and blushing tonalities recalling pastels.

Bibliography

Aldo de Rinaldis, " L'Arte in Roma ", Bologna 1948
Nicola Spinosa, "La pittura in Italia. Il Settecento", vol. Il, Milan, 1990

References
 
 Artnet's artists' directory 

18th-century Italian painters
Italian male painters
Painters from Turin
Court painters
1689 births
1770 deaths
Painters at the Portuguese royal court
18th-century Italian male artists